William Robert Hart (1 April 1923 – March 1990) was an English professional footballer who played as a right half.

Career
Born in North Shields, Hart played for Newcastle United, Chesterfield and Bradford City.

For Bradford City he made 25 appearances in the Football League.

Sources

References

1923 births
1990 deaths
English footballers
Newcastle United F.C. players
Chesterfield F.C. players
Bradford City A.F.C. players
English Football League players
Association football wing halves